Egnatius "Iggy" Katona (August 16, 1916 – December 4, 2003) was an American stock car racing driver from Willis, Michigan. He is most famous for his performance in the ARCA series in the 1950s, 1960s, and 1970s, where he won six championships and 79 races, the latter of which stood as a series record until Frank Kimmel surpassed it in 2013. Other ARCA records held by Katona include most starts (630), oldest race winner (57 years old, Daytona International Speedway, 1974) and most consecutive seasons with a win (19, from 1953–1971)

Early career
Katona started out racing motorcycles in local races in Michigan and Ohio at age 21, winning nearly every race he entered.

After a brief tour of duty in the Army during World War II, he turned to midget car racing. Building his own engines and chassis and with his two sons Ronnie and Jim as crew members, Katona found success on four wheels as well, including winning 14 feature races in a row at Detroit's famed Motor City Speedway dirt oval.

MARC/ARCA career
In 1952, fellow Toledoan John Marcum created his Midwest Association for Race Cars as a Northern counterpart to the Southern stock car series of the day, Bill France, Sr.'s NASCAR. Katona was a force in the series from the beginning, finishing 3rd in the series' inaugural campaign in 1953, 2nd in 1954, and winning the championship in 1955, 1956, and 1957. His 4th MARC championship came in 1962 driving his #30 Ford.

Although he developed his racing skills on the short tracks of the Midwest, Katona adapted well when the MARC changed its name to ARCA and began racing on superspeedways in 1964, winning the ARCA race at Daytona three times. He won his 5th and 6th titles in 1966 and – at the age of 51 – 1967. His consistency was his biggest asset; he finished in the top ten in series points 21 straight seasons, from 1953–73.

References

External links

1916 births
2003 deaths
American people of Hungarian descent
Racing drivers from Ohio
ARCA Menards Series drivers
People from Washtenaw County, Michigan
United States Army personnel of World War II